Donald Malone (born 29 July 1985) is an Australian Rugby league Player for the North Queensland Cowboys in the NRL.
He made his NRL debut in Round 22, 2009.

Malone, a former Ipswich Jet, predominantly plays on the wing.

He is the nephew of former Brisbane Broncos, QLD and Australian centre Steve Renouf.

He scored his first NRL try on 6 September 2009 in the final round of the season against the Sydney Roosters.

He scored 34 tries for the Ipswich Jets in the Queensland Cup.

In 2012, he was named in the Queensland Residents side and the Queensland Murris to face the USA Tomahawks at Honolulu in which the Murris won 72–10.

References

External links
North Queensland Cowboys profile

1985 births
Australian rugby league players
Indigenous Australian rugby league players
Rugby league centres
Eastern Suburbs Tigers players
North Queensland Cowboys players
Rugby league fullbacks
Ipswich Jets players
Rugby league wingers
Living people
Place of birth missing (living people)